Cold Mountain is a  mountain in the Kamnik Alps. Cold Mountain rises over three valleys: the Logar Valley,  the Matk Cirque, and the Vellach Combe. It is rarely visited because it is relatively difficult to ascend with many exposed areas. The border with Austria runs along the northern and western side, and until 1967 it was difficult to access because of political problems. Its first climbers had problems scaling it. In 1876, Robert von Lendenfeld and a guide named Matijevec from Luče reached the western peak and they descended, thinking they had reached the highest peak. In the same year Johannes Frischauf, Piskernik, and Matek finally conquered the top. The Frischauf Lodge on Okrešelj is named after him.

Routes 
 3½h from the Frischauf Lodge at Okrešelj
 4½h from the Logar Sisters Lodge
 5½ from the Czech Lodge at Spodnje Ravni
 5½ from Vellach through the Vellach Combe

References
 Slovenska planinska pot, Planinski vodnik, PZS, 2012, Milenko Arnejšek - Prle, Andraž Poljanec

External links 
 Opis poti na Mrzlo goro iz Matkovega kota (Description of the Route to Cold Mountain from the Matk Cirque) 
 Cold Mountain on hribi.net Route Description and Photos 

Mountains of the Kamnik–Savinja Alps
Mountains of Styria (Slovenia)
Two-thousanders of Slovenia